The National Alternative Dispute Resolution Advisory Council (NADRAC) was an Australian independent body that provided policy advice about alternative dispute resolution (ADR) to the Attorney-General of Australia. NADRAC was established in October 1995 and concluded in late 2013. NADRAC's functions were laid down by its charter.

NADRAC was an independent non-statutory body, with funding provided through the Australian Government Attorney-General's Department. It provided expert policy advice to the Attorney-General on the development of ADR and promoted the use of alternative dispute resolution.
 
The body concluded its work following the government decision to simplify and streamline government business. NADRAC made substantial contributions to the development and promotion of ADR in Australia, publishing reports and papers on the topic.

Council members
 Jeremy Gormly SC (chair) 
 Professor Nadja Alexander 
 Dr Andrew Bickerdike
 Mr David Fredericks
 Ms Dianne Gibson
 The Hon Justice Andrew Greenwood 
 Ms Margaret Halsmith
 Mr Tom Howe QC 
 Mr Peter Kell
 Mr Stephen Lancken
 Ms Helen Marks
 Ms Lindsay Smith
 Professor Tania Sourdin

See also
 Mediation
 Mediation in Australia

References

Defunct Commonwealth Government agencies of Australia